This list of United States congressional candidates who received campaign money from the National Rifle Association of America is from the nonpartisan group OpenSecrets which extracts campaign contribution data from the Federal Election Commission. It includes current as well as former representatives and senators as well as candidates for office for the 2016 and 2018 election cycles. This list shows only the direct contributions to each campaign but does not include more substantive contributions for lobbying and outside spending. In 2016, direct contributions (in this list) totaled $1,085,100; lobbying efforts (not in this list) totaled $3,188,000; and outside spending (not in this list) totaled $54,398,558. The issue of gun control has become increasingly important in American politics.

References

National Rifle Association

Congressional candidates
National Rifle Association
Congressional candidates